The Scotland women's national squash team represents Scotland in international squash team competitions, and is governed by Scottish Squash and Racketball.

Since 1981, Scotland has finished in one fourth place of the World Squash Team Open, in 1981.

Current team
 Frania Gillen-Buchert
 Alex Clark
 Rosie Allen

Results

World Team Squash Championships

See also 
 Scottish Squash and Racketball
 World Team Squash Championships
 Scotland men's national squash team

References

External links
 Scottish Squash and Racketball website

Squash teams
Women's national squash teams
Squash in Scotland
Squash